41st Regiment, 41st Infantry Regiment or 41st Armoured Regiment may refer to:

Infantry regiments
 41st Dogras, an infantry regiment of the British Indian army
 41st Infantry Regiment (Greece)
 41st Infantry Regiment (Philippine Commonwealth), a unit of the Philippine Commonwealth Army 
 41st (Welsh) Regiment of Foot (United Kingdom), a unit of the British Army 
 41st Infantry Regiment (United States), a unit of the United States Army

Armoured regiments
 41 Armoured Regiment (India), a unit of the Union of India Army 
 41st (Oldham) Royal Tank Regiment (United Kingdom), a unit of the British Army  
 40th/41st Royal Tank Regiment (United Kingdom), a unit of the British Army

Bomber regiments
 41st Bomber Aviation Regiment, a aviation unit of the Yugoslav Air Force

Engineer regiments
 41 Combat Engineer Regiment, a unit of the Canadian Army

American Civil War regiments
 41st Illinois Volunteer Infantry Regiment, a unit of the Union (North) Army during the American Civil War 
 41st Indiana Infantry Regiment, a unit of the Union (North) Army during the American Civil War  
 41st Regiment Massachusetts Volunteer Infantry, a unit of the Union (North) Army during the American Civil War  
 41st Wisconsin Volunteer Infantry Regiment, a unit of the Union (North) Army during the American Civil War 
 41st New York Volunteer Infantry Regiment, a unit of the Union (North) Army during the American Civil War 
 41st Virginia Infantry, a unit of the Confederate (Southern) Army during the American Civil War

See also
 41st Division (disambiguation)
 41st Brigade (disambiguation)
 41st Squadron (disambiguation)
 41st Battalion (disambiguation)